= Chethan Gowda =

Indian activist

Chethan Manchegowda
- Born: 14 February 2000 (age 25); Bangalore, India
- Education: East West Institute Of Technology
- Occupations: Entrepreneur, Founder Director, Khoon
- Awards: Rotary Vocational Awardee 2017 Ashoka Youth Venturer Young Social Entrepreneur of the Year 2017 Champion of Change 2012

Chethan Manchegowda known as Chethan M (born 11 February 2000) is a social rights and health activist from India. He spent most of his childhood in the social sector. Due to an incident wherein he lost his teacher as she could not procure blood at the right time, he started his own organization titled khoon Organization with an aim to make sure nobody dies due to the unavailability of blood. His efforts to make the society better made him the "Most Impactful" person in the social sector in India under the age of 21 awarded by Youth For Seva, as well as TEDx speaker. He was also recognized by Ashoka Innovators For Public as a "Youth Venturer" in 2016.

== Early life ==
Brought up in Bangalore, Chethan did his schooling from Shanthinikethana School and is currently pursuing engineering at East West Institute of Technology.

== Social entrepreneur ==
Chethan has co-founded three startups, Chittii, an online handwritten letter service provider cum creative arts marketplace which was started in 2018, Dream Teams, a community based organization in 2015 and Khoon, a not for profit organization in the field of Blood Donation which was started in 2016.
